Airsoft is a sport in which players use airsoft guns to fire plastic projectiles at other players in order to eliminate them. Due to the often-realistic appearance of airsoft guns and their ability to fire projectiles at relatively high speeds, laws have been put in place in many countries to regulate both the sport of airsoft and the airsoft guns themselves. Safety regulations in many areas require an orange or red tip on the end of the barrel in order to distinguish the airsoft gun from a working firearm. They are officially classed as "soft air devices" or "air compressed toys", depending on the jurisdiction. A handful of countries including Australia, China, Malaysia and Singapore, have laws that are deemed to be airsoft-unfriendly.

Australia

Importation of airsoft guns (referred officially as toy models by the Department of Immigration and Border Protection), regardless of their legal status by state, requires an Australian Customs B709 Importation of Firearms – Police Confirmation and Certification Form. These forms can be obtained from the relevant state's police department, however some states may require operators hold a valid license for the class of firearm wished to import before the forms will be issued. Due to the strict regulation of airsoft guns, gel blasters have become a popular alternative.

The following types of airsoft guns are illegal in all states:
 Airsoft guns capable of fully automatic fire.
 Airsoft guns that outwardly resemble a working firearm.

Possession and importation of airsoft weapons are banned outright in the states of New South Wales, Victoria, Queensland, Western Australia, South Australia, and Tasmania.  Tasmania has also banned the game of airsoft, as well as paintball, stating that they are "war games."

Northern Territory
Airsoft firearms are legal to buy in the Northern Territory, provided one has the necessary licenses.

Australian Capital Territory
The Registrar of the Australian Capital Territory has a list of approved replica weapons and airsoft guns. Outside of the approved list, all airsoft guns that resemble semiautomatic or automatic military rifles or shotguns adapted for military purpose are considered prohibited weapons, as are an imitation or replica of any firearm.

Argentina
In Argentina, Airsoft guns can be bought and used by anyone over the age of 18, however the import, sale and manufacture of replica guns requires a permit by federal law 26.216.

Armenia
Airsoft guns with muzzle energy below three joules (a muzzle velocity of 173.2 m/s or 568 ft/s for a 0.20 g projectile) are legal. They are not considered weapons and do not require any licenses or permissions to buy.

Belgium
In Belgium, weapons that launch a projectile without the use of gunpowder are unrestricted for people over the age of 18 as long as the weapon is longer than 60 cm, has a barrel longer than 30 cm, and has a muzzle energy of less than 7.5 joules.

Commercial sales, imports, and exports may be done only by licensed firearms dealers. Non-commercial sales or owner transfers can be done by anyone aged 18 years or older.

All events must take place in private locations with the prior notification and permission of the local governing body and law enforcement. Airsoft organizations are prohibited from maintaining affiliation with ideological or religious agendas. In the Flemish region, when organizing more than two times per year, an environment permit must be acquired. When organizing in a designated forest area, permission from the regional forest agency is needed. In the Walloon area in general it is sufficient to inform the local authorities.

Strict environmental laws mandate the exclusive use of bio-degradable BBs.

Brazil
Airsoft is a very recent shooting sport in Brazil. In the past, due to lack of regulation, airsoft was usually misinterpreted as a firearm clone or replica. Nowadays, airsoft is legal but there are strong restrictions. Based on the current minutes that have gone public, airsoft guns are not considered firearms, but they are still considered controlled items. To import is necessary to pay import taxes of 60% of the value of the product including the freight plus about 150 reais (around 50 dollars) for administrative fees. It is also necessary before importing any weapon or accessory of weapon to make an application of CII (International Import Certificate) to the Brazilian Army containing the data of the equipment that wants to import, location of the airport or port of departure in the country of foreigner and in the national arrival, store and buyer data and product values. This request can be approved or denied and can take up to three months (this response must be sent to the seller to attach to the outside of the merchandise if it does not have CII when the merchandise arrives in Brazil it will be confiscated). This bureaucracy causes a gigantic delay in the domestic market with the international market, it also causes the lack of use of low prices abroad and as Brazil has high-interest rates( along with import taxes) the product often comes to triple the price. All Guns do not need any transportation permit after import. 
People under 18 are not allowed to buy airsoft guns and commercial entities/importers are obliged to retain documentation of airsoft buyers for five years. An Orange tip or red tip is required in order to differentiate it from firearms. There are still strong restrictions to import accessories such as holographic sights, red dots, and magazines (need CII and administrative taxes).
Airsoft is also expensive in Brazil, as it costs almost the same as a real firearm in the US, which will make it very hard for airsoft to become popular in Brazil. However, now the sport has grown quite large due to the YouTubers and it is estimated almost 100 thousand participants(11/14/2017). The Brazilian market due to the high import rates are loaded with cheap weapons of entry of brands like CYMA, JG, King Arms, Cybergun, and Umarex.
The airsoft community adopts national speed limits but there is no compelling law. The most usual limits are:
Assault: 400FPS.
Sniper Semi-Auto (M110 SASS, PSG-1 etc.): 500FPS and do not shoot less than 15 meters, mandatory secondary up to 400 fps.
Sniper: 550FPS and do not shoot less than 15 meters, mandatory secondary up to 400 fps.
DMR: 450FPS and not shoot less than 15 meters, mandatory secondary up to 400 fps.

Bulgaria
Airsoft is a legal sport in Bulgaria and there are no restrictions placed on the guns apart from a parents' permission for people under 18. As airsoft guns are considered air guns by the Bulgarian law, no documents or licenses are needed to possess them. There are no restrictions about lasers, flashlights etc. Moreover, there is no need for the end of the barrel to be painted in orange (like in the United States). There are neither restrictions about the power of the air guns/airsoft guns (although there are official rules, enforced by the individual airsoft fields or by Airsoft Sofia in games, that they organize) nor about carrying them in public areas, although it is highly advisable not to carry replica firearms in public places outside of a carry case or an appropriate backpack. This rule is unofficially enforced by the Airsoft Sofia organisation and is punishable by ban from official games (temporary or permanent), as it creates an unwanted friction between the players and the authorities and public.

Shooting in "protected" (quote from the law) areas is forbidden. Protected areas include schools, administrative buildings, public property, and public areas. Now it is required that private regulated land must obtain urban planning application / consent to make it public land before starting a paintball field with an internal boundary of 3 m. A lot of the people in Bulgaria have their own field rules which usually require to have 18 years of age. There are some exceptions though:The CRG airsoft field in Sunny beach has no age limit (http://www.crgroup.bg/) and the Airsoft Sofia Field has an age restriction of 16, and players between the age of 16 and 18 can participate with parental permission. (http://airsoftsofiafield.com)

Canada
Airsoft guns that are not replicas of real weapons are not illegal or heavily restricted in Canada. Under the Canadian Firearms Program, Airsoft guns resembling with near precision an existing make and model of an arm, other than an antique arm, and with a muzzle velocity below 366 feet per second, are considered replica arms and therefore are prohibited devices. Models resembling antique arms may be allowed. Generally, antique arms are those manufactured before 1898. Individuals may keep replica guns they owned on 1December 1998 and no license is required, however the import or acquisition of replica firearms is prohibited. If the replica firearm is taken out of Canada it will not be allowed back in.

Non replica air guns with a minimum muzzle velocity of 111.6 m/s (366 ft/s) and maximum muzzle velocity of 152.4 m/s (500 ft/s) or a maximum muzzle energy of 5.7 joules (4.2 foot-pounds) are exempt from licensing, registration, and other requirements; and from penalties for possessing an arm without a valid license or registration certificate but legislation tabled by the Federal Government in 2022 will, if passed, move air guns firing at those speeds into the same class of guns as airsoft guns and those replicas (BBs and Pellets mostly) will be illegal as well. All replicas no matter what the muzzle velocity are considered a firearm under the Criminal Code if used to commit a crime. Airsoft guns that exceed both the maximum velocity and maximum muzzle energy are subject to the same licence, registration, and safe handling requirements that apply to conventional firearm. An airsoft gun may be imported if it meets the required markings.
An airsoft gun that is obviously a child's toy, i.e. made out of clear plastic, that fires only a very light pellet (less than 2g) no faster than 152.4 m/s (500 ft/s) would not be classified as a firearm under the Canadian Firearms Act.

In Manitoba, Saskatchewan, Ontario, British Columbia, and Quebec, the minimum age to purchase an airsoft gun is 18. Children under that age are still able to use airsoft guns but only if supervised by someone over 18. 

Overseas/international retailers may sell Canadian-ready guns, or offer services to make them meet Canada's requirements.

On February 16, 2021, BILL C-21, "An Act to amend certain Acts and to make certain consequential amendments (firearms)" was introduced. While the proposed changes are to "combat intimate partner and gender-based violence and self-harm involving firearms, fight gun smuggling and trafficking, help municipalities create safer communities, give young people the opportunities and resources they need to resist lives of crime, protect Canadians from gun violence, and subject owners of firearms prohibited on May 1, 2020 to non-permissive storage requirements, should they choose not to participate in the buyback program," it also aims to change the criminal code on airsoft guns (known as uncontrolled firearms or "mid velocity replicas").

The bill would make all airsoft guns full replicas and aims to "Ensure mid-velocity 'replica' firearms are prohibited" by:

 Update the Criminal Code to ensure that any device, including an unregulated airgun that looks exactly like a conventional regulated firearm (i.e., shoots over 500 feet per second), is prohibited for the purposes of import, export, sale and transfer.
 Current owners may keep their 'replicas' but cannot transfer them to anyone else.
 No further 'replica' firearms could be imported into, or sold/transferred in Canada.
 This amendment does not affect other types of airguns that do not exactly replicate a conventional regulated firearm.

The bill never passed any level of legislation and automatically died in parliament when Prime Minister Justin Trudeau called for a snap election on August 15, 2021. The Conservative Party of Canada and the New Democratic Party however, along with at least 2 Liberals shortly after the bill was announced, have shown opposition to this section of the bill, recognizing it as a safe recreational activity. Jack Harris of the NDP has stated "Banning of airsoft rifles is putting them in the same category as prohibited weapons and that is wrong." Shannon Stubbs stated "The Liberals are actually imposing a ban on airsoft and a partial ban on paintball. Any rational common sense person can see that toy guns are not responsible for shootings causing deaths in Canadian cities. Criminals and gangs with illegal guns are tragically ending the lives of Canadians while this provision and C-21's ends hundreds of livelihoods, legacies and jobs and outlaws an entirely harmless hobby enjoyed by more than 60,000 Canadians."

Charlottetown Liberal MP Sean Casey said to the CBC there are good reasons to include replica firearms in Bill C-21, but he believes that the bill as it stands goes too far by saying "It isn't just the military-style assault replicas that are being banned by this bill; it's anything that resembles a firearm … An airsoft replica of a hunting rifle is banned, and that's wrong and that's overreaching." As the bill was going into the committee stage, he continued with "It's at that stage where those in the airsoft business will have an opportunity to come before the public safety committee to lay out their concerns, to suggest changes to make the bill better and quite frankly, I hope that their input will result in some common-sense changes to the bill."

In the months following, Conservative MP Ted Falk responded saying "This is silly and it does nothing to address real gun violence in Canada. Conservative MP Jeremy Patzer said "In all seriousness this is more than the Liberals being killjoys." Bloc Quebecois MP Kristina Michaud said "The governments approach is kind of "ad hoc" and we should look at alternatives rather than just banning everything overnight," continuing by saying "I agree the government must better supervise the sale of replica paintball (the bill would ban magazine fed paintball guns as well) and airsoft weapons but this can be done while respecting those who practice these activities safely. This bill is absolutely flawed."

With the Conservatives, NDP and Bloc Quebecois as a whole and even some Liberals completely opposing the ban, combined with the Liberal's still only holding a minority (with almost the exact same number of seats) after the 2021 snap election, the likelihood of airsoft being banned is unlikely but the chances of airsoft guns being more regulated in the future is still a strong possibility.

Chile
Chile recognized airsoft as a legal sport activity under Exempt Resolution No. 245 of 20 January 2011 by the National Institute of Sports.

Although airsoft replicas are not clearly regulated under Chilean gun law, modifying toy guns to use real ammunition and carrying an unconcealed weapon in a public area is illegal and punishable by law. There is currently no law that restricts who may acquire or use an airsoft gun. However, stores and sport clubs usually only permit their use or acquisition to individuals that are 18 years old or older.

China

In the People's Republic of China, despite the common belief that airsoft is outright banned, the official stance on airsoft is that it is technically just "tightly controlled". However, the control standards are so strict and the punishments are so heavy-handed, that involvement in the sport (regarded as "wargame" or "live action CS") is considered too impractical for common individuals in Mainland China.

According to the "Identification Standards of Imitation Guns" (仿真枪认定标准) dictated by the Ministry of Public Security (the central coordinating agency of the Chinese police system) in 2008, a replica ("imitation") gun is recognized according to any one of the following criteria:
 Fulfils the firearm component parts stipulated by the Law of the People's Republic of China on Control of Guns, and shoots pellets of metal or other materials that has a muzzle-ratio kinetic energy (the muzzle energy of a projectile divided by the internal/bore cross sectional area of the barrel that fired it) less than 1.8 J/cm2 and greater than 0.16 J/cm2 (equivalent to a single 0.20 gram, 6 mm airsoft pellet shot out at a muzzle velocity of 21.3 ~ 71.3 m/s or 70 ~ 234 fps, or kinetic energy of 0.045 ~ 0.51 J);
 Has external features of a firearm, as well as barrel, trigger, receiver or action mechanisms that are either materially or functionally similar to a service firearm;
 Has same or similar shape and color, as well as a size between 50 ~ 100% (later amended to "50 ~ 200 %" in 2011) of the corresponding real service firearm.
If a replica exceeds any single criterion, it will no longer be categorized as a replica/toy gun, but rather considered a real weapon, and therefore illegal to purchase and possess. Offenders can be judged as arms traffickers and subjected to penalties as high as capital punishment and life imprisonment.

Prior to the Beijing Olympics, airsoft was an increasingly popular sport among Chinese military enthusiasts. However, since the 2008 standards came out, there have been thousands of arrests and seizures made on toy gun merchants and consumers for "arms trafficking" and "illegal possession of firearms", because people are often unaware that their hobbies are now suddenly spelt as illegal under the new standards, and the Ministry of Public Security or police never actively informed the public about the change. Law enforcement is also highly arbitrary, and many of the merchandises confiscated are actually either non-functional props or well below the replica limit. This is also compounded by hyped moral panics from the mass media and parents groups who exaggerate the safety threat posed by these toys. Such examples include confusing the definition of airsoft guns with the far more powerful air guns, slippery slope arguments that airsoft weapons can be easily modified to shoot more lethal projectiles or even converted into real firearms, or alarmist overgeneralization of danger citing demonstrations from inappropriately designed experiments of how airsoft guns are capable of penetrate paper targets at point-blank range, all appealing for a blanket ban on replica toys out of concerns for child safety.

As a result of the crackdown by the authorities and negative social sentiments from various moral entrepreneurs, airsoft is in effect banished from the public eyes, and domestic manufacturers and importers have become essentially extinct. However, despite all the negativities against the sport, many people (even some police officers) still take risks to acquire airsoft replicas (often bought from Hong Kong, then secretly smuggled back into the Mainland via Shenzhen). To avoid the government tracing online, various underground airsoft community forums often refer the commonly seen battery-powered automatic airsoft guns as "electric dogs" (playing a joking near-homophone on the English word "gun") or "pets". Alternative MilSim activities using gel ball shooters (similar to Maya's Xploderz) or even foam dart shooters (similar to Hasbro's Nerf Blaster) as replacements have also become increasingly popular.

There has also been ongoing debates in the blogosphere against the official "1.8 J/cm2" definition, since the pre-2008 Chinese criteria defined that a minimal muzzle-ratio kinetic energy (MRKE) of 16 J/cm2 was needed to breach human skin at close range and hence qualifiable as a real firearm — nine times higher than the current standards. In comparison, the maximum MRKE allowed for replica guns in Hong Kong is at 7.077 J/cm2, Taiwan at 20 J/cm2 and Japan at 3.2 J/cm2, while most other countries like Germany and United States are often at up to 78.5 J/cm2 (though with restrictions on minimal engagement distances). Some netizens even accused the legislative and law enforcement authorities of procrastinative/corrupt practices because it is much more convenient for police officers to claim commendations and promotions from picking on soft targets such as the generally law-abiding toy gun owners, rather than risking violence to confront the often threatening real criminals. This sentiment was often reinforced by reports of selective enforcements, where offenders of special backgrounds (foreign nationals, ethnic minorities, political/social elites and associates) were given significantly lighter penalty than other average citizens. Some legal academics and lawyers have also pointed out that the Ministry of Public Security, who solely dictated the above-mentioned definition on real guns vs. replicas, is a law enforcement body but not a legislative one, and thus has no jurisdiction in defining legal standards, meaning that the current replica gun standard is in fact unconstitutional.

Croatia
Airsoft replicas fall into the D category of weapons and to buy one, users have to be at least 14 years old.
The maximum allowed muzzle velocity for various categories of rifles by Croatian Airsoft Federation are:

AEG - 1,49J (joules) - max 1,56J
Machinegun - 1,49J (joula) - max 1,56J
DMR - 2,32J (joules) – max 2,42J (minimum allowed range of action is 20 m, mandatory sidearm and integrated optics to enlarge ) 
Bolt-action - 3,34J (joules) - max 3,46J (minimum allowed range of action is 30 m, mandatory sidearm and integrated optics to enlarge )

use automatic ( burst ) mode shooting replicas in enclosed spaces is allowed if the replicas do not have a kinetic energy greater than 0,84J ( joules ), mandatory reporting of such replicas to the organizer, it is referred to in the manner and at the discretion of the organizers

- ALLOWED use only replicas which are in reality DMR any other conversions are not allowed AK / M4 ff .

- Replicas of the DMR, which are not mechanically unable to switch to auto -fire regime can not be used at the meeting

Czech Republic
Airsoft guns in the Czech Republic are "category D firearms", which are regulated by Czech Firearms and Ammunition act. Weapons and ammunition can be purchased, owned and used by anyone older than 18 years old. There is no need to have any certificate or permission. Airsoft weapons are prohibited to use in public places where they might threaten other people or damage property. Airsoft guns are limited to 16 joules, but this is a limitation for all weapons in categoryD, those with higher muzzle energy are categoryC-I weapons and require a registration of the weapon but unlike category C weapons do not require gun permit (zbrojní průkaz). However, most airsoft guns have much lower muzzle energy than 16 Joules. Carrying any visible firearm by a civilian in public places is prohibited.

Denmark
Airsoft guns are mentioned as exempt in the Danish "Våbenlov" (arms control legislation). Persons have to be at least 18 years old to buy, hand over, or possess airsoft guns. They may be used on police-approved sites, with a permission slip, at the age of 16. A firearms certificate is not required. All airsoft guns have to be transported concealed in a bag, in a trunk, etc.

Egypt
Airsoft guns are legal to own or possess in Egypt, it's sold by some weapon stores. Civilians cannot import or order Airsoft Weapons, only weapon stores can import them as Air Guns. You may also find some low-quality, plastic, and unbranded Airsoft Spring Guns in Toy Stores or Gift Store, They are popular During Ramadan, Eid al-Fitr, and Eid al-Adha.

Currently, civilians interested in the sport are appealing to the Egyptian government to allow the importation and ownership of airsoft guns.

Estonia
The law does not mention or recognize airsoft guns in detail but sets restrictions on the public carry of firearm replicas. While the current firearm law would classify airsoft guns as airguns, it also sets restrictions for airguns to not exceed 4.5mm diameter pellets (.177 caliber,) making 6mm BB's de jure illegal. Despite laws being unclear, the sport is practiced widely without any actual issues so far. Customs enable import without any limitations, local law enforcement is aware of public sales and organized events, and even the military has acquired airsoft guns for urban and close-quarters combat training.

Finland
Airsoft guns are not treated as firearms in law, but visible transportation of any replica firearms in public areas is forbidden. All replica firearms must be covered with something, for example, a firearm case, when moving on public area. Land owner's permission is needed to play airsoft in any area.

Jokamiehenoikeus ("Everyman's right") rights do not apply to airsoft, you cannot use this right as a basis to play in government forests.

Minors (under the age of 18) are able to purchase airsoft guns only with written permission from their legal guardians.

France
Visible transportation of replica firearms in public areas is forbidden. They must be covered with something like a firearm case. Land owner's permission is needed to play airsoft in any area. An orange marking on the tip is not needed.

Minors (under 18) can only buy airsoft guns that are under 0.08 joules in power. Airsoft guns may only have a muzzle energy under two joules (464 fps with 0.2g bb's), otherwise they are no longer qualified as airsoft replicas but firearms and owners should follow the French weapons law (dated 2013).

Germany
Airsoft guns under 0.5 joules are deemed to be toy guns and can be used by all people above the age of 14. Some shops do still require a legal guardian to be in attendance and give permission when buying a <0.5 joule airsoft gun, however most shops sell these toy guns to anybody above the age of 14. In addition, they must not be carried in public as they can be authentic looking weapons.
If the muzzle energy is between 0.5 and 7.5 joules, Airsoft guns are no longer seen as toy guns. In that case, they are treated as air rifles, the minimum age for purchasing and / or using an airsoft gun is 18 years. These guns need a special marking, the so-called "F in a pentagon" and have to be not able to shoot fully automatically, otherwise they are illegal to possess.

The trade and possession of Airsoft guns is otherwise mainly unrestricted, but transportation is permitted only in a closed container. Transportation of toys with a weapon like look requires a locked container. The shoot or ready access port is permitted only on a closed private property and if this doesn't disturb any other people.

The possession of lasers and lamps mounted on airsoft guns is illegal. The possession of a device that is intended to be mounted on a gun and project light in any form in front of the muzzle is illegal. A violation constitutes an offense.

Greece
Airsoft is basically an underground sport in Greece because the law is unclear. According to the law, airsoft guns fall into the same general category as air guns, which are not real firearms, and are free to be purchased from specialized shops.

It is prohibited to have any replica gun in public sight. This is treated similarly to illegal possession of a real firearm.

Hong Kong
In Hong Kong, airsoft guns are considered toys as long as they are not able to be fired with a muzzle energy above two joules of kinetic energy, above which they are considered as a firearm and need registration, and possession of an unregistered firearm is illegal. Under the Section 13 of Cap 238 Firearms and Ammunition Ordinance of the Hong Kong Law, unrestricted use of firearms and ammunition requires a license. Those found in possession without a license could be fined HKD$100,000 and be imprisoned for up to 14
years.

Airsoft guns in Hong Kong are not required to have an orange tip. However, public possession or exposure of airsoft gun is not recommended by the police department in Hong Kong, as it is difficult to identify whether it is a real firearm or not. It is also not required to obtain a licence to sell an airsoft gun in Hong Kong.

Hungary

In Hungary the law classifies airsoft guns as air guns. They can be owned from the age of 18 without any license.

Indonesia
In Indonesia, there are no strict rules about airsoft and there still has been no consideration by the government as to whether airsoft guns are treated as "toys" or are equal to real guns. However, when airsoft was first brought to Indonesia in 1996, founders of Indonesian airsoft communities put some restrictions on airsoft games. For example, airsoft players are encouraged not to upgrade their gun above 450 fps, or they will be rejected from the community. Moreover, anyone who wants to buy an airsoft gun, must be at least 18 years old and know the regulations and rules about the airsoft gun.

Some events have occurred that are perceived as endangering the continuity of the hobby, such as some robberies in which airsoft replicas were used. Therefore, in order to control its growth, there is a government-authorized club called Perbakin (Indonesian Shooting Club) which is currently appointed by police to accommodate airsoft as a new-born sport.

In recent developments in the start of 2013, the police and people from the airsoft communities have exchanged words and are now in a negotiation to legalize the sport provided the players make their units (AEGs or GBBRs) distinctive from a real firearm through the use of orange tipped muzzle brakes

India

Airsoft is an unrecognized sporting activity in India. Officially, mention of this sport does not exist in Indian sports guidelines, laws or documents. Therefore, it does not come under any category of sports or recreational activities.

India does not have an airsoft manufacturing sector like most other nations. Thus every need for this activity has to be met through imports. Since the Indian Customs and the government are not aware about the existence of this sport or the nature of equipment used, imports will get seized citing resemblance to firearms. Inclusion of these items under Toy category rarely happens due to lack of awareness. There is also the risk of wrong classification under prohibited airgun caliber since only .177 cal is allowed for conditional civilian import into India. Detained items may be destroyed or sent for lab tests depending on the situation, with long waiting periods to obtain results.

Another side of non-recognition is the pseudo legal nature of this activity, since it is not mentioned anywhere. This has resulted in a thriving black market which effectively destroyed the true nature of this sport in India. Entry level equipment are being sold at more than premium prices with active support from corrupt authorities. This ended up turning airsoft into a collection activity than a field sport.

This does not mean airsoft as a sport is not happening in India. It is unorganized and in a much smaller scale than developed nations. Also some imports are successful, but these are mostly exception than norm.

There is also recognized airsoft community in India like Airsoft Sporting Community of India (ASCI).

Ireland
The status of airsoft in Ireland was changed after the 2006 Criminal Justice Act, which amended the previous Firearms Acts. Where once authorisation or a license was required for all devices which fired a projectile from a barrel, the law now defines a firearm as (amongst other things):

an air gun (including an air rifle and air pistol) with a muzzle energy greater than one joule of kinetic energy or any other firearm incorporating a barrel from which any projectile can be discharged with such a muzzle energy

The aim of this change was to establish a classification of firearms in order to eliminate the legal oddity where toy suction cup dart guns and the like were legally classified as firearms, thus bringing Ireland into line with the rest of the EU. In this case, one joule was used as the limit, as opposed to seven joules in Germany, twelve foot-pounds force (16.2 J) in the UK and so on. The one-joule limit most likely arose from UK case law where it was found that energies in excess of one joule were required to penetrate an eyeball (thus causing serious injury). As a result, airsoft devices under one joule of power have been declassified and have become legal to possess and use within Ireland.
No airsoft site in Ireland would allow any player to use an airsoft device in excess of one Joule.

Israel
Airsoft guns are classified as "dangerous toys" in Israel which makes airsoft legal to import, manufacture and sell by licensed retailers only. Due to the fact that this law is not related to criminal acts, thus not being very well enforced, until the year 2010, it was possible to find private retailers who import MPEG and AEG level airsoft guns. Currently, purchase of airsoft guns of all levels is possible only through one or two licensed retailers.

Israeli airsofters have created airsoft associations in an attempt to make airsoft legal − Girit "Girit Airsoft Association in Israel" ("גירית – עמותת איירסופט לישראל") and ASI − Association of Israeli Strikeball (עמותת סטרייקבול ישראלית). 
Girit is cooperating with the Israeli Shooting Federation, joining it shortly as a member and cooperating with other governmental authorities in an attempt to make airsoft legal in Israel.

Girit Airsoft Association has established cooperation with USAPSA, Ukrainian, Slovenian, Swedish, and Czech airsofters. An Israeli national airsoft tactical shooting competition took place near Beit Berel March 2007.

As of Jul 2010, the Israeli airsoft associations had finished negotiations with the Israeli government. Since then, every association (or Tacticball Club Member) can carry airsoft gear (guns, parts, etc.) at home. Also transportation and carrying of airsoft guns may be done only if a tip of the barrel painted in red or orange color.

Italy
Airsoft guns and pistols are allowed a muzzle energy equal or minor to one joule. Under the law, airsoft guns are not classified as firearms, but as toys. One can buy and sell them both from stores and from another private citizen, either domestically or from abroad. Internet purchasing and mail shipping is legal and unrestricted. No license or registration is required. There is no mandatory minimum age to purchase airsoft and use it. The Italian Ministry of Interior only recommends that their sale be restricted to people over the age of 18 or 14 if accompanied by a parent or legal tutor or if the replica is not particularly realistic or powerful (i.e. low-grade airsoft products).

Red tips must be present on the barrel ends of the airsoft gun when they are imported and sold by a store. Once owning the airsoft gun, one may remove the red tip. However, the similarity between genuine firearms and airsoft replicas is close enough to provoke interaction with law enforcement personnel if an airsoft gun is mistaken for its real counterpart. Airsoft used to commit a crime is treated as if using the real gun, assault weapons carry an extra mandatory sentence in addition to the regular punishment for the crime committed.

Usage and open carriage of airsoft guns in public places is forbidden. One can play on private property away from public sight or in a well-delimited private or state property after having asked the local authorities for a limited-time permit (usually from six to 48 hours) and having alerted the local police command to avoid alarmed citizens calling for emergency.

As the law limits the muzzle energy that an airsoft replica can develop before being classified by law as an air gun, modifying an airsoft gun to deliver more power or to shoot anything other than 6 mm BB plastic pellets is a felony.

Airsoft rental is illegal in Italy. You'll need a license to rent every time, but it's legal to buy one without a license.

Japan
In Japan, airsoft guns are legal, but may not shoot with a muzzle energy above 3.5 J/cm2. This means a maximum of 0.989J in case of using 6mm BBs and 1.64J using 8mm BBs. And for adolescents, 0.135 joules. (Currently there are no 10+ 8mm airsoft guns)

Legal requirements are based on an airsoft model manufacturers to prevent any possibility of replica firearms being converted into actual firearms. Standards include (but are not limited to) use of low-melting point metals and non-ballistic plastics in structural components and incompatibility of mechanical components with actual firearm components and mechanisms. The overall litmus test used by the Japanese National Police Authority is whether the replica firearm can be made to chamber and fire an actual round of ammunition. These standards have proven successful within Japan, as it has been found that criminal elements discovered that it is significantly easier to purchase an actual illegal firearm in comparison to modifying a comparatively fragile replica into a functional firearm. Due to this reality, most crimes involving a threat of physical violence are perpetrated with edged weapons, however, firearms seen in public are still (by default) seen as real by the public at large.

Kuwait
In Kuwait, airsoft guns are illegal. Airguns have a different procedure.

Latvia 
As of 2020, 1,5 Joules is the maximum allowed muzzle energy limit for use in airsoft games. Airsoft guns are now considered low-energy airguns and as such are only sold to persons over the age of 18.

Lithuania
Registration of any sort is not required for airsoft firearms. If the gun has under 2.5 Joules of energy, it is not considered a weapon and only those over 18 years of age can purchase airsoft.

Macau
Airsoft guns with under two joules muzzle energy are legal.

Malta
Airsoft guns were legally introduced in 1985. They have been classified under the category of air guns. In this classification, one finds air rifles (any power limit), airsoft guns, and paintball guns. At that time, to own and purchase any of these guns, one must have a Target Shooter B license and be member of a registered and licensed club.

Now, there is an amendment to the current regulation which came into effect in 2013 for airsoft and paintball guns, which are non-lethal guns.

It is no longer required to have a Target shooter license B to purchase, use, and own airsoft or paintball devices.

Mexico

Airsoft is not currently regulated in Mexico and replicas are not governed by the Federal Law on Firearms and Explosives nor its regulations. Accordingly, the practice of Airsoft as well as the ownership and possession of Airsoft replicas and accessories is a legal activity in the country under the Constitution.

The import of Gas Blow Back Airsoft replicas or other replicas powered by a compressed gas and its parts are in fact regulated, requiring a permit issued by the Ministry of National Defense. Airsoft replicas powered by a piston and spring mechanism, such as bolt action replicas and AEGs, are not subject to an import permit.

For purposes of the General Law on Import and Export Tariffs, Airsoft replicas as well as Paintball guns and any other artifacts shooting projectiles of any kind through the use of compressed gasses (air, propane, green gas, red gas, etc.) that are not the result of the conflagration of gunpowder or similar substances, are classified under Heading 93 (Weapons) of the Tariff, subheading 04 pertaining to (Other Weapons - actioned by spring or compressed gases), and would generally fall within the scope of subheading 9304.00.99 (Others), as provided by notes four, five and six of the Explanatory Notes to the Import Tariff, published by the Ministry of Economy on July 7, 2007, in the Official Gazette of the Federation.

Weapons based on air compressed by spring or piston are specifically excluded therefrom. Refer to the following regulations: Acuerdo que establece la clasificación y codificación de las mercancías cuya importación o exportación están sujetas a regulación por parte de la Secretaría de la Defensa Nacional, published in the Official Gazette of the Federation (Diario Oficial de la Federación) 30 June 2007, modified by executive orders published in October 2014, and 13 January 2016.

Even though AEGs and Spring Powered replicas are not required to process an import permit from the Ministry of Defense, care should be taken by anyone importing any such replicas as customs will seize the replica and direct the importer of record to get an Import Permit with the Ministry of Defense. The importer must be well prepared with documentation in Spanish showing the technical specifications and characteristics of the replicas in question, before the Customs authorities will authorize the extraction of the replica from customs premises.

For any doubts as to whether a particular item is subject to an import permit, any individual or entity can submit a consultation with the National Defense Authority addressed to Dirección General del Registro Federal de Armas de Fuego y Control de Explosivos, Miguel de Cervantes Saavedra número 596, Campo Militar número 1-J, Predio Reforma, D.F., colonia Irrigación, CDMX, México.

Netherlands
On 1 January 2013, new Dutch laws regarding airsoft came into effect. Airsoft devices are air, gas, or spring powered weapons with a maximum shooting energy of 3.5 Joule and look almost completely like real firearms. Those who wish to possess an airsoft replica or participate in a skirmish will have to be registered with a certified airsoft organization. As of May 2016, only the NABV, the Dutch Airsoft Sport Association, was registered. Participation in a skirmish for non members is allowed up to six times per Year, but the Dutch Airsoft Sports Association will need to receive certain details about the player, this is usually done when you Rent at an airsoft Site. In order to obtain membership with the NABV a person must pass a police background check and must not have committed any crimes in the last eight years.

Since 1 April 2019 a new regulation has been introduced that ensures that replicas are now measured with joules instead of fps, this is done with bb's of at least 0.3 grams instead of 0.2. Replicas have the following joule values: Bolt action sniper: 2.3 joules (499 fps with 0.2 grams), DMR: 1.7 joules (430 fps with 0.2 grams), AEG: 1.2 joules (360 fps with 0.2 grams).

Replicas with two seconds delay are no longer part of the sniper class and are identified as DMR. Also AEG are only allowed to shoot up to 0.3 grams bb's while DMR and BAS can shoot up to 0.4 grams this change was made for safety.
Any player who is not a Dutch citizen can play without membership in the Netherlands, but they have to file for Exemption at the Dutch Airsoft Sport Association

New Zealand
Air-powered firearms are legal to possess and use in New Zealand, provided that the person is either over 18 years of age or 16 with a firearms license. A person under 18 may not possess an air gun, but may use one under the direct supervision of someone over 18 or a firearms license holder (Direct supervision requires that the license holder be able to take control of the firearm at all times, so they must remain within arms reach).

It is illegal to use these firearms in any manner that may endanger or intimidate members of the public except where there is reasonable cause such as an airsoft game.

In order to import an airsoft gun, one must meet one of these stipulations:

Seeks to possess the restricted airgun as part of a collection, and demonstrates that it fits with and enhances an existing collection.
Participates in an identifiable shooting discipline or sport at an incorporated sports club with rules encouraging safe and legal use of airguns and a range certified for the shooting activity and intends to use the restricted airgun in an event at that sports club.
Wishes to use the restricted airgun in a capacity equivalent to that described in section 29(2)(e) of the Arms Act 1983 ('theatrical purposes').
Wishes to replace an unsafe or unserviceable restricted airgun.
Requires the restricted airgun for occupational purposes.
The individual applying for the permit to import demonstrates the special significance of that particular restricted airgun as an heirloom or memento.
A dealer needs to import restricted airguns for the purposes of maintaining a stock of restricted airguns used for an identifiable shooting discipline or sport.
A dealer is importing the restricted airgun as agent for an individual who has a special reason for importing that item.
A dealer wishes to replace an unsafe or unserviceable restricted airgun.

Norway
The arms control legislation (Våpenforskrift) requires that one has to be at least 18 years old to buy airsoft but can use and own airsoft as a minor if they are wearing protection and have approval by parents.

Using an airsoft firearm while committing a crime receives the same punishment as the one received for using a real weapon. One is also required to carry firearms inside a bag, or some other kind of container to conceal the firearm from the public.

Philippines
In the Letter of Instruction 1264, a Presidential Directive, signed by former President Ferdinand Marcos in 1982, bans the import, sale and public display of gun replicas. to classify what constitutes a gun replica and airsoft guns were deemed different from replicas, therefore the common legal interpretation is that there may be no need to repeal LOI 1264 in order to achieve full legalization of airsoft in the Philippines.

Republic Act No. 10591 declassified airsoft weapons as actual firearms. A ban places airsoft guns on the list of banned firearms. It classifies that no person is permitted to carry firearms in public except for security officers, police officers and military personnel on duty.

This is a revision of the article. In the Philippines, you need to get a PTT (Permit To Transport) license and license the replica as a firearm with the government. It is also required thet the individual is joining a bonifide airsoft club and must be 18 years of age or older. You also need a license to manufacture/sale a airsoft replica. It is also mandated to have a Permit To Carry outside of residency license. Failure to comply with the rule is punishable by correctional imprisonment and a fine of Ten thousand Pesos (₱10,000). Please revise this article if needed.

Poland
Airsoft guns as well as the sport of Airsoft are legal in Poland. The law does not distinguish Airsoft guns from Airguns, thus the only requirement is that they cannot exceed 17J of energy, which would classify them as pneumatic weapons. Open carrying an Airsoft replica in a public area is prohibited. Using an Airsoft replica is not a crime, but a lot of events take place in woods or abandoned buildings, so using grenades during the games may attract attention of police officers (normally they give you a warning and go away). One must be 18 to buy an Airsoft gun but there are no age restrictions to who can use one. Usually power limits are only for playing in buildings from 350fps to 450fps depending on the region with single fire restriction for stronger guns. In some regions no fps limits apply, this may vary from event to event so checking with the event organizer is a must.

Portugal
With the new revision of the "Firearms and Ammunition Act", airsoft guns are not considered as firearms. Currently, the formal definition of an Airsoft gun is a recreational firearm reproduction (a"replica" have a different legal application under the same law). However, in order to be characterized as a recreational firearm reproduction, its muzzle energy must not exceed 1.3 J (equivalent to a muzzle velocity of 374 fps with a 0,2g BB).
The minimum age to purchase and use these reproductions is 18 years old but can drop to 16 if a written parental consent is issued.

Under the same act, to purchase and operate an Airsoft gun, one must be a member of an APD - Sport Promotion Association.
Recognition of this APD is made by the IPDJ - Portuguese Youth and Sports Institute as it represents the state. The Firearms and Ammunition Act also states that after being approved by the IDP, the APD must be enlisted as such by the Portuguese law enforcement authority. There are several APDs for Airsoft in Portugal, CAM - Clube de Airsoft da Maia, ALA (FPA) Associação Lusitana de Airsoft, APA - Associação Portuguesa de Airsoft, ANA - Associação Nacional de Airsoft, APMA - Associação Portuguesa de Milsim e Airsoft, ADAPT - Associação Desportiva de Airsoft Português, and AACP - Associação Airsoft Costa de Prata.

In addition, Airsoft guns have to be painted either in fluorescent yellow or fluorescent red and be in compliance with the following criteria:

Long guns (more than 60 cm total length AND more than 30 cm of barrel)- 10 cm from the barrel tip and 100% of the stock.
Short guns (less than 60 cm total length OR less than 30 cm of barrel)- 5 cm from the barrel tip and 100% of the grip.

Republic of Korea
Airsoft guns in Republic of Korea are deemed to be toy guns (not for sports) but considered illegal and imitation guns if any of the laws are broken.

According to the "ENFORCEMENT DECREE OF THE CONTROL OF FIREARMS, SWORDS, EXPLOSIVES, ETC. ACT", (총포·도검·화약류등단속법시행령) in 2017, imitation guns are recognized according to any one of the following criteria: 
1. An object manufactured by metal or non-metal material, very similar to shape of the gun that can be high possibility to use for crime.
2. An object manufactured by metal or non-metal material, shoots metal or non-metal projectile, or make sound/fire that any one of the following criteria:
a. Diameter of the projectile is less than 5.7mm
b. Weight of the projectile is over 0.2g
c. Kinetic energy (destructive power) of the projectile is over 0.02kgm
d. Head of the projectile is sharp that not round treated
e. An object make instant explosion sound is over the 90db or make combustible flame

Romania
Law nr. 295 (Regimul Armelor şi Muniţiilor) regulates all use of firearms and associated ammunition. The law is quite unclear (concerning airsoft firearms) as to whether this kind of firearm classifies as a "non-lethal weapon" or "toy." The law regulates the use of air-powered firearms (e.g. sport/competition use that use a metal projectile) under the "non-lethal" category and solely requires that one is at least 18 years old to purchase and register the firearm at the police precinct nearest to one's location. Any air/gas-powered weapon that shoots plastic projectiles only and does not exceed the velocity of 220 m/s (e.g.: airsoft guns) can be purchased by anyone who has 18+ years old without any need of registering.

The law specifies that usage of night vision (infrared) or laser aiming devices designed for military use is completely restricted to members of the army and associated entities even if the aiming device is used on a lower-restriction category firearm (e.g. such as on an airsoft gun). The law, however, does not restrict in any way the use of aiming devices not designed for military use.

The use or show of airsoft guns replicas is not permitted in public places, they can be used only in dedicated or non populated areas with the permission of the owner / administrator. For transporting, the airsoft replica must be unloaded and secured from public view (transportation bag).

Furthermore, the law specifies that, should one attempt to use a non-lethal or replica gun to perform (or attempt to perform) armed robbery, one shall be prosecuted as if a real firearm had been used.

Russia
Airsoft guns with a muzzle energy below three joules (muzzle velocity 173.2 m/s for 0.20 g projectiles) are legal, are not considered weapons, and you have to be 14 or older to play.

Serbia
According to the Law on Weapons and Ammunition, airsoft guns fall into category D in classification of weapons, which means anyone over 9
 may legally acquire an airsoft gun. No licensing is required. There are no special regulations regarding shape, function or other characteristics of an airsoft gun.

Slovakia
Airsoft guns have a status similar to the Czech Republic, where they are considered to be firearms. All firearms are governed by law 190/2003. Here, airsoft guns fit into firearm class D (§7b) and no permit is needed. The use of airsoft guns is allowed by players that are least 18 years old. Guns may not have an energy greater than 15 joules. The use of night vision scopes is forbidden. The owner of a gun is required by law to secure the firearm when not using it.

Importation of airsoft guns (from outside of EU), all critical parts/components of airsoft guns and aiming devices (optics, RDS, etc.) are permitted only with a weapon importation license. For airsoft parts, most monitored on customs are barrels, optics, magazines, receivers and accessories like grenades. Springs, gears, hop-ups, pistons, cylinders, switches, triggers are usually let through. External and non-critical parts like rails, holders, bipods, etc. can be legally imported without the license.

Slovenia
There is no age restriction on playing airsoft in Slovenia, but most stores enforce 18+ rule or to be accompanied with a parent or a guardian to buy a replica. For games, in serious clubs, the age limit is usually 14+ with the parents or guardians written consent although there is no legal requirement for this. For bigger events 18+ rule is usually enforced by the organisers.
Replicas are forbidden to be carried in public as the police will treat them as real weapons.

Singapore
In Singapore, airsoft guns were allowed in civilian ownership until October 2001 when the country's Weapons and Firearms Act was amended to prohibit ownership after police reports of people getting hurt by misuse. It is illegal for civilians to own or import Airsoft guns or accessories, unless granted a license. A law was passed in Jan 2021 to better regulate replica guns as they are deemed to be too little risk to warrant tight regulation. However, the legality of importing and ownership of airsoft is still assumed to be unchanged.

Spain
Players have to comply with their Town Halls' requirements, which differ from town to town. Some towns however require players to provide a clear Criminal Record Certificate, pass a psychological exam (usual for firearms), have the guns serialized by a certified armorer, and have them inspected to check that the serial numbers match the declared ones. It is legal to buy, possess and sell airsoft replicas and accessories.

Attention !
Since December 27, 2012, the airsoft guns are now considered 4th category weapons, for which we need to have them duly registered.

Last update published on 10/23/2017 of the Spanish Weapon Regulations:
https://www.boe.es/buscar/pdf/1993/BOE-A-1993-6202-consolidado.pdf
And also the last update on specific laws in airsoft and paintball guns on 02/05/2013:
https://www.boe.es/buscar/pdf/2013/BOE-A-2013-153-consolidado.pdf

     Section 3. Classification of statutory weapons
     Article 3.
     4th category:
     1. Carbines and pistols, semi-automatic and repeating shot; and double revolvers action, driven by air or other compressed gas not assimilated to shotguns.
     2. Carbines and pistols, of smooth or striped bore, and of a single shot, and revolvers of simple action, driven by air or another compressed gas not assimilated to shotguns.

Weapons cards:
http://www.interior.gob.es/web/servicios-al-ciudadano/seguridad/armas-y-explosivos/tarjetas-de-armas
http://www.guardiacivil.es/es/servicios/armasyexplosivo/controldearmas/autorizaci_armas/tarjetas_armas/index.html

Required documentation:
     Certificate of criminal record in force.
     Photocopy of the applicant's DNI
     Purchase bill of the weapon
     Weapons cards
     Present the weapon for which the Card is requested

Weapons transport
To carry and use weapons of the fourth category, they must be documented individually by a weapon card according to article 105 of the Weapons Regulation.
Articles 146, 147, 148 and 149 of said Weapons Regulation also apply.

Sweden
In Sweden, Airsoft devices are considered limited effect firearms, and thusly fall under the Swedish Gun laws. To buy, and possess a limited effect firearm, one needs to be at least 18 years old (the law also makes room for special permits for people under 18 years old, but to date, no one seems to have been issued such a permit). Minors can be lent a limited effect firearm, if the lender is closely supervising and able to take the device from the minor immediately if needed. Violations of this is considered a guncrime, and both the minor, lender and the minor's guardians can be held accountable, with prison as a possible outcome if severe enough.

In order to possess a CO2, air, or spring operated firearm without a license, the impact energy of a projectile fired at a distance of four meters (from the muzzle) must be less than ten joules.
Or three joules if automatic.

As of 27 August 2015 a lower limit for limited effect firearms was set at 0.2 joules.

As of 2 January 2015 it is legal to own and import gas operated airsoft weapons.

Switzerland
In Switzerland, airsoft guns are considered weapons. Airsoft guns may not be sold to or possessed by persons who are under 18 or who have a criminal conviction. Additionally, airsoft guns may not be sold to individuals from Albania, Algeria, Bosnia-Herzegovina, Kosovo, North Macedonia, Serbia, Turkey or Sri Lanka.

The importation of airsoft guns is restricted to companies and individuals who hold weapons import licences. Private individuals can apply for a permit to import up to three airsoft guns which is valid for six months.

For private sales to take place, there must be a written contract between both parties. Both parties are required to retain the contract for a period of ten years. As long as they contain no propellant, there is no restriction on the purchase or import of airsoft BBs. It is illegal to carry any Airsoft guns in a public place, however it is permissible to transport them directly between a player's home and an event site.

Thailand
Only Whitelist shops that can sell Airsoft guns and supplies, the law is a bit vague. Paintball guns, BB guns, and Airsoft guns are not considered firearms, but for import/export need to have license that have quota how many you can import/export per year and renew the license every year, so it is legal to possess them without having a permit or registering them. However the owner must comply with the following conditions:
 Only plastic bullets are used.
 When carrying the gun outside of the owner's property, it must be packed in a safe case or box. It is not allowed to be carried in shirt or trouser pockets, nor can it be left out in the open.
 The gun cannot be used to commit a crime or torture animals.

The gun is considered illegal if any of these rules are broken.

Ukraine
Airsoft guns with a muzzle energy below three joules (muzzle velocity 173.2 m/s for 0.20 g projectiles) are legal, are not considered weapons, and do not require any permission.

United Arab Emirates

Airsoft guns are legal to own or possess in the UAE. Airsoft guns are sold by weapon stores. Civilians are not permitted to import Airsoft guns, but weapon stores can import them with special permits.

Airsoft is not registered as an organised sport, although there are official Airsoft and paintball arenas.

Airsoft players in UAE typically play with Airsoft guns with a round speed under 450 FPS (feet per second). It is legal to buy and use tactical gear in the UAE except that which is used by the military or law enforcement.

It is illegal to openly carry or use Airsoft guns in public areas. Airsoft guns can be used only inside official airsoft and paintball facilities, and must be kept in a safe location. Criminal charges will apply for violating or misusing Airsoft guns as per UAE government law.

United Kingdom
There are currently certain restrictions on the possession of airsoft replicas, which came in with the introduction of the ASBA (Anti-Social Behaviour Act 2003) Amendments, prohibiting the possession of any firearms replica in a public place without good cause (to be concealed in a gun case or container only, not to be left in view of public at any time).

According to Section 36 of the VCRA (Violent Crime Reduction Act 2006) which came into effect on 1October 2007, RIF's (Realistic Imitation Firearms) may not be sold, imported, or manufactured. Unrealistic imitation firearms (IF's) must have their principal color as transparent, bright red, bright orange, bright yellow, bright blue, bright green, bright pink, or bright purple or have dimensions of no more than a height of 38 millimetres and a length of 70 millimetres (as defined in the Home Office regulations for the VCRA). Exceptions to the act are available for the following:
 a museum or gallery
 theatrical performances and rehearsals of such performances
 the production of films and television programs
 the organisation and holding of historical re-enactments
 crown servants.

The notes for the VCRA state the following: "The regulations provide for two new defenses. The first is for the organisation and holding of airsoft skirmishing. This is defined by reference to "permitted activities" and the defence applies only where third party liability insurance is held in respect of the activities." and "The defence for airsoft skirmishing can apply to individual players because their purchase of realistic imitation firearms for this purpose is considered part of the "holding" of a skirmishing event."

The airsoft defence is based on whether or not a person is a skirmisher. One of the measures put in place by retailers was the forming of a centrally recorded and maintained database. This system is managed by the United Kingdom Airsoft Retailers Association or UKARA. UKARA shares the database of registered skirmishers with the member retailers allowing verification that the purchaser is allowed to buy a RIF under the VCRA skirmisher defence. To qualify for the UKARA database, a person must skirmish three or more times over a period of at least 56 days, and typically at one site. The airsoft site they register at must hold Public Liability Insurance.

It is an offence for anyone under 18 to purchase an airsoft gun (realistic or otherwise) or to sell one to a person under 18. Gifting is not an offence, therefore a person over 18 can buy one for a minor.

Following an amendment to the Policing and Crime Act 2017 which came into effect on 2May 2017, airsoft guns (realistic or otherwise) are defined in UK law by the muzzle kinetic energy with which they are capable of firing a projectile, and are exempted from firearms legislation. An airsoft gun firing a projectile with a muzzle kinetic energy greater than the ones outlined in the PCA 2017 is no longer considered to be an airsoft gun and falls under firearms legislation. The specified muzzle kinetic energies are 1.3 joules for any automatic gun (which is capable of discharging two or
more missiles successively without repeated pressure on the trigger) and 2.5 joules for all other guns.

United States
Under federal law, airsoft guns are not classified as firearms and are legal for all ages, so a person of any age may use one (and with the permission of their parents, for anyone under 18). This is also the case for the laws in each state. However, in some major cities, the definition of a firearm within their respected ordinances includes propulsion by spring or compressed air, thus making airsoft subject to applicable laws. For example, airsoft guns within the state of California can be bought only by a person above the age of 18. However, no laws indicate an age requirement to sell airsoft guns. Generally speaking, toy, look-alike, and imitation firearms must have an orange tip during shipping and transportation.

Airsoft guns in the United States are generally sold with a 0.24in. or longer orange tip on the barrel in order to distinguish them from real firearms, as is required by federal law. Manufacturers and importers may cite Part 272 of Title 15 of the Code of Federal Regulations on foreign commerce and trade (15 CFR 272), which stipulates that "no person shall manufacture, enter into commerce, ship, transport, or receive any toy, look-alike, or imitation firearm" without approved markings; these may include an orange tip, orange barrel plug, brightly colored exterior of the whole toy, or transparent construction. However these restrictions do not apply to "traditional B-B, paint-ball, or pellet-firing air guns that expel a projectile through the force of compressed air, compressed gas, or mechanical spring action, or any combination thereof." This language exempts airsoft guns from these requirements, placing them in the same category as bb-guns, pellet, air, and paintball, none of which are conventionally sold or used with an orange tip, and many of which bear as much resemblance to real firearms as airsoft guns do.

Airsoft guns' trademarks must be removed where the manufacturer does not have an existing license agreement with the manufacturer of the real fire arm. For example: Classic Army has a Sublicensing agreement with ActionSportGames® A/S (ASG) which holds the worldwide rights for ArmaLite and others, so the trademarks can stay on imported replicas of ArmaLite's weapons. In practice, enforcement is a hit or a miss. One might get an "unlicensed" gun through customs with trademarks intact, while a licensed gun might be held in customs by a uniformed customs agent. In early 2007, a United States House of Representatives resolution to allow imports to retain trademarks, even without agreement between the real firearms manufacturer and the replica manufacturer, was unsuccessful.

In addition, the similarity between genuine firearms and airsoft replicas is close enough to provoke interaction with local law enforcement personnel if an airsoft gun is carried openly in public. If someone were to, for example, attempt a robbery with an airsoft gun, they would be charged as if the airsoft gun were a real firearm. In some recent cases, people carrying or brandishing airsoft guns have been fatally shot by law enforcement personnel:

 (2006) Christopher Penley, Longwood, Florida
 (2007) Justin Gregg, Denton, Texas
 (2011) Ernest Vassell, Miami, Florida
 (2011) Kyle Miller, Broomfield, Colorado
 (2012) Jaime Gonzalez Jr., Brownsville, Texas
 (2013) Andy Lopez, Santa Rosa, California
 (2014) Rocendo Arias, Yakima, Washington
 (2014) John Crawford III, Dayton, Ohio
 (2014) Kristopher Barkus, Butler Township, Pennsylvania
 (2014) Sebastian Lewandowski, Vancouver, Washington
 (2014) Tamir Rice, Cleveland, Ohio
 (2015) Matthew Hoffman (apparent suicide), San Francisco, California
 (2015) Cody Evans, Provo, Utah
 (2015) Vincente David Montano, Nashville, Tennessee
 (2015) La'Vante Biggs, Durham, North Carolina
 (2016) Christine Lucas, Rising Sun, Maryland
 (2016) Charles Hollstein, Zion, Illinois
 (2016) Eric Provost, Orlando, Florida
 (2016) Thomas Hirko, Perry Township, Ohio
 (2016) Paul Gaston, Cheviot, Ohio
 (2016) Lionel Gibson, Long Beach, California
 (2016) Tyre King, Columbus, Ohio

Selected local requirements
California makes it illegal to sell Airsoft/BB guns to anyone under 18 without their parent's permission and all airsoft guns are required to be fitted with an orange blaze barrel for sale and transport. Since 2016, the state will also require all airsoft guns to have fluorescent coloration over the trigger guard and grip (with additional requirements for rifles or long guns).

During 1987 in New York City, more than 1400 toy imitation weapons involved in criminal acts were seized by New York City police; approximately 80 percent higher from the previous four years. On the basis of legislative intent dealing with the increasing volume of criminal acts in correlation with toy imitation weapons, New York City introduced new guidelines regulating the manufacture, importation, distribution, and sale of such imitation weapons. New York City requires that all realistic toy or imitation firearms be made of clear or brightly colored plastics. Furthermore, New York City makes possession of any pistol or rifle or similar instrument in which the propelling force is a spring or air unlawful without a license. See New York City Administrative Code § 10-131(b) and New York City Administrative Code § 10-131(g)(1)(a).

Michigan formerly required airsoft guns to visually indicate that they are "replicas", usually with an orange tip. In 2015, SB 85 modified areas of Michigan law to distinguish air and spring-fired guns from other traditional firearms. The change in law also forbid localities from adding additional restrictions to airsoft guns beyond the state regulations.

Texas allows airsoft guns to be owned, but most cities require that the airsoft guns be discharged only while outside city limits.

Some cities in Illinois consider shipping or distributing airsoft guns illegal.

In Minnesota, it is illegal for a child under the age of 14 to possess an airsoft gun unless under the supervision of a parent or adult. It is also illegal for any child under 16 to purchase an airsoft gun without parental advisory involvement. In Saint Paul and Minneapolis, airsoft guns cannot be carried in public unless they either have an orange tip or the airsoft guns are clear or brightly colored. It is legal to possess airsoft guns in these cities as long as they are transported in a closed and fastened gun case (in accordance with Minnesota firearm transportation laws) and unloaded. The vast majority of municipalities (Excluding Duluth and Rochester) in Minnesota ban the firing of an airsoft gun within the city limits.

Arkansas has passed a bill which went into effect in January 2010 which mirrors the federal law on airsoft guns in that it bans the sale or transport airsoft guns without orange tips, a transparent/translucent body, or colored other than black/brown/blue/silver/metallic. Guns that are translucent or clear are allowed to be sold or transported. The bill bans "imitation firearms", but has the following to say about the definition of "imitation firearms" in section 2B:
"Imitation firearm" does not include:
(1) A nonfiring, collector replica of an antique firearm developed before 1898.
(2) Traditional BB, paintball, or pellet-firing air guns that expel a projectile through the force of air pressure.
(3) A device:
(A) For which an orange solid plug or marking is permanently affixed to the muzzle end of the barrel for a depth of not more than six millimeters (6 mm).
(B) For which the entire exterior surface is predominantly colored other than black, brown, blue, silver, or metallic.
(C) That is constructed of transparent or translucent materials that permit unmistakable observation of the complete contents of the device.

Therefore, the bill bans neither: imitation firearms (including airsoft guns) that are predominantly colored something other than black, brown, blue, silver or metallic; nor imitation firearms that are built of predominantly transparent or translucent materials, allowing anyone to determine the contents of the firearm; nor those which have bright orange tips which indicate that they are a "toy" and not a real firearm.

In New Jersey, airsoft guns currently do not fall under the state's definition of firearms. Instead, like other 'toy' guns, they are regulated as 'imitation firearms', but how they are regulated can vary differently from city to city. It seems their role in state law comes from the fact that airsoft guns do not typically carry enough force combined with the materials of the projectile to cause an assured level of damage akin to that of real steel firearms or their more conventional cousins, the airgun or BB gun. Airsoft guns typically deliver projectiles at a lower velocity than airguns and fire polymer BB's which are not typically capable of piercing clothing, flesh, or bone in the same manner as full metal BB's or pellets or real steel ammunition.

Between 2006 and 2012, bills such as S810, the last descendant of four bills to have been introduced to the senate, were created to revise the legislature and "clarify" that airsoft guns fall under the state's definition of firearms. It did so by adding that "polymer balls and metallic-coated polymer balls" identify as one of the projectiles launched by airguns. All four bills have been unsuccessful in becoming law, thus airsoft guns have retained their status as imitation firearms. Under NJ law, imitation firearms are fake guns that can be reasonably mistaken for real firearms.

Very few cities in New Jersey regulate airsoft guns, and the ones that do also regulate imitation firearms such as cap guns, etc., in the same manner. Most cities and counties in the Garden State regard airsoft guns as "toys" and as such are subject to federal and state imitation firearm laws which almost completely mirror the laws of their real steel counterparts. As they are not real steel firearms, airsoft guns do not require permits nor a Firearms Purchaser Identification card (also known as an FID) to purchase or own. However, to purchase an airsoft gun, one must be at least 18 years old and the gun must be sold with an orange tip in compliance with federal law. However, the Garden State does not regulate those under age 18 purchasing airsoft from online retailers. Evike, Elite Force, and other imitation firearm manufacturers that are based in states other than New Jersey can ship airsoft to those in the Garden State under the age of 18 while still being in compliance with the Law of New Jersey.

It is a crime to fire or brandish airsoft guns in public view; airsoft guns should be fired indoors, on private property, or anywhere designated for use of airsoft guns such as an outdoor or indoor airsoft field. When transporting airsoft guns they must be stored in a gun bag away from public view. While transporting by vehicle they must remain inside their bag(s), and in the trunk of said vehicle. Carrying an airsoft gun on one's person, for example in one's waistband, outside or off of personal private property, and not in a bag or fastened case is cause for alarm in New Jersey. Should an observer assume it is a real firearm, it can lead to confiscation of the airsoft gun and in some cases prosecution for possession of an imitation firearm for unlawful purpose.

If determined by an observer or law enforcement that a person is carrying an airsoft gun to commit a crime or using one during the commission of a crime, that person will be charged with possession of an imitation firearm for unlawful purpose. This charge can accompany crimes as low as disorderly conduct to generating public alarm to assault to armed robbery.

As earlier mentioned, a few cities in New Jersey have their own separate laws regarding imitation firearms. However, the majority follow federal and state guidelines regarding these guns. Atlantic City, in particular, has placed a ban on the sale and possession of "realistic-looking toy guns" within the city unless if they are colored in a manner that can immediately identify them as toys. Clear imitation firearms are also acceptable. An exception applies to this ban if said imitation firearms are non-firing antiques or movie props. As such, information about airsoft and other imitation firearms laws in local areas should be retrieved from the city in question's police department. For current state laws, it is best to contact the Firearms Investigation Unit of the New Jersey State Police, or the office of the Attorney General.

In Illinois, you have to be 18 to buy one at the counter, but to shoot one you can be of any age.

References

 Philippines, Airsoft guns need to be registered - 
 American Airsoft Laws

http://scag.darkbb.com/front-page-f9/pnp-circular-no-11-t222.htm

Airsoft
Airsoft guns
Airsoft shooting sports
Law
Toy weapons